The Lion Feuchtwanger Prize is a German literary prize for historical prose. It is awarded by the Academy of Arts, Berlin on 7 July, the anniversary of his birthday. It was endowed by Marta Feuchtwanger, the widow of Lion Feuchtwanger. It was awarded annually between 1971 and 1992. Subsequently it has been awarded less regularly.   The prize is worth €7,500 to the winner, whose identity is determined by a jury of three members.

Past winners 

 1971: Hans Lorbeer
 1972: Franz Fühmann
 1973: Hedda Zinner 
 1974: Christa Johannsen 
 1975: Heinz Kamnitzer 
 1976: Rosemarie Schuder 
 1977: (none)
 1978: Waldtraut Lewin 
 1979: Gerhard W. Menzel 
 1980: Jan Koplowitz 
 1981: Günter de Bruyn 
 1982: Heinz Bergschicker 
 1983: Gerhard Scheibner 
 1984: Kurt David 
 1985: Volker Ebersbach
 1986: Heinz Knobloch 
 1987: Sigrid Damm 
 1988: Eckart Krumbholz 
 1989: Walter Beltz 
 1990: Horst Drescher 
 1991: Brigitte Struzyk 
 1992: Peter Härtling 

 1998: Eckart Kleßmann 
 2000: Michael Kleeberg
 2002: Robert Menasse 
 2004: Edgar Hilsenrath 
 2009: Reinhard Jirgl

German literary awards